Marián Kovačócy (born 17 September 1984) is a Slovak sports shooter. He competed in the men's trap event at the 2016 Summer Olympics.

References

External links
 

1984 births
Living people
Slovak male sport shooters
Olympic shooters of Slovakia
Shooters at the 2016 Summer Olympics
European Games competitors for Slovakia
Shooters at the 2019 European Games
Shooters at the 2020 Summer Olympics
Sportspeople from Trnava